The  is a coastal region on the Pacific Ocean, extending from southern Aomori Prefecture, through Iwate Prefecture and northern Miyagi Prefecture in northeastern Honshū, which is Japan's main island. The name comes from the historical region of Sanriku (lit. "three riku"), referring to the former provinces of Rikuō, Rikuchū and Rikuzen.

Tourist destination
There are the Tanesashi Coast, the Rikuchu Kaigan National Park and the Minami-Sanriku Kinkazan Quasi-National Park in the Sanriku Coast region.

Earthquakes and tsunami

The bays of this ria coastline tend to amplify the destructiveness of tsunami waves.
Significant events which devastated coastal communities include:

 869 Jogan Sanriku earthquake
 1611 Keicho Sanriku earthquake
 1896 Meiji Sanriku earthquake
 1933 Showa Sanriku earthquake
 1960 Valdivia earthquake

 2011 Tōhoku earthquake and tsunami

Prior to 2011, the tsunami history of Sanriku might have been interpreted as a story of progressively fewer casualties due to human intervention and planning. The 2011 disaster created a new baseline for analysis of regularly occurring tsunamis.

See also
 Sanriku Railway
 Sanriku, Iwate
 Tōhoku region
 Tōsandō

Notes

Regions of Japan
Geography of Aomori Prefecture
Geography of Iwate Prefecture
Geography of Miyagi Prefecture
Landforms of Aomori Prefecture
Landforms of Iwate Prefecture
Landforms of Miyagi Prefecture
Coasts of Japan